Decimus Junius Juvenalis, known in English as Juvenal, was a Roman poet active in the late first and early second century CE. He is the author of the collection of satirical poems known as the Satires. The details of Juvenal's life are unclear, although references within his text to known persons of the late first and early second centuries CE fix his earliest date of composition. One recent scholar argues that his first book was published in 100 or 101. A reference to a political figure dates his fifth and final surviving book to sometime after 127.

Juvenal wrote at least 16 poems in the verse form dactylic hexameter. These poems cover a range of Roman topics. This follows Lucilius—the originator of the Roman satire genre, and it fits within a poetic tradition that also includes Horace and Persius. The Satires are a vital source for the study of ancient Rome from a number of perspectives, although their comic mode of expression makes it problematic to accept the content as strictly factual. At first glance the Satires could be read as a critique of Rome. That critique may have ensured their preservation by the Christian monastic scriptoria although the majority of ancient texts did not survive.

Life 

Details of the author's life cannot be reconstructed definitively. The Vita Iuvenalis (Life of Juvenal), a biography of the author that became associated with his manuscripts no later than the tenth century, is little more than an extrapolation from the Satires.

Traditional biographies, including the Vita Iuvenalis, give us the writer's full name and also tell us that he was either the son, or adopted son, of a rich freedman. He is supposed to have been a pupil of Quintilian, and to have practised rhetoric until he was middle-aged, both as amusement and for legal purposes. The Satires do make frequent and accurate references to the operation of the Roman legal system. His career as a satirist is supposed to have begun at a fairly late stage in his life.

Biographies agree in giving his birthplace as the Volscian town of Aquinum and also, in allotting to his life a period of exile, which supposedly was due to his insulting an actor who had high levels of court influence. The emperor who banished him was Trajan or Domitian. A preponderance of the biographies place his exile in Egypt, with the exception of one that opts for Scotland.

Only one of these traditional biographies supplies a date of birth for Juvenal: it gives 55 CE, which most probably is speculation, but accords reasonably well with the rest of the evidence. Other traditions have him surviving for some time past the year of Hadrian's death (138 CE). Some sources place his death in exile, others have him being recalled to Rome (the latter of which is considered more plausible by contemporary scholars). If he was exiled by Domitian, then it is possible that he was one of the political exiles recalled during the brief reign of Nerva.

It is impossible to tell how much of the content of these traditional biographies is fiction and how much is fact. Large parts clearly are mere deduction from Juvenal's writings, but some elements appear more substantial. Juvenal never mentions a period of exile in his life, yet it appears in every extant traditional biography. Many scholars think the idea to be a later invention; the Satires do display some knowledge of Egypt and Britain, and it is thought that this gave rise to the tradition that Juvenal was exiled. Others, however - particularly Gilbert Highet - regard the exile as factual, and these scholars also supply a concrete date for the exile: 93 CE until 96, when Nerva became emperor. They argue that a reference to Juvenal in one of Martial's poems, which is dated to 92, is impossible if, at this stage Juvenal was already in exile, or, had served his time in exile, since in that case, Martial would not have wished to antagonise Domitian by mentioning such a persona non grata as Juvenal. If Juvenal was exiled, he would have lost his patrimony, and this may explain the consistent descriptions of the life of the client he bemoans in the Satires.

The only other biographical evidence available is a dedicatory inscription said to have been found at Aquinum in the nineteenth century, which consists of the following text:

 ...]RI·SACRVM
 ...]NIVS·IVVENALIS
 ...] COH·[.]·DELMATARVM
 II·VIR·QVINQ·FLAMEN
 DIVI·VESPASIANI
 VOVIT·DEDICAV[...]UE
 SVA                     PEC

[CERE]RI·SACRVM
[D(ECIMVS) IV]NIVS·IVVENALIS
[TRIB(VNVS)] COH(ORTIS)·[I]·DELMATARVM
II·VIR·QVINQ(VENNALIS)·FLAMEN
DIVI·VESPASIANI
VOVIT·DEDICAV[ITQ]VE
SVA PEC(VNIA)

 To Ceres (this) sacred (thing)
 (Decimus Junius?) Juvenalis
 military tribune of the first cohort of the Dalmatian (legions)
 Duovir, Quinquennalis, Flamen
 of the Divine Vespasian
 vowed and dedicated
 at his own expense
 (Corpus Inscriptionum Latinarum X.5382)

Scholars usually are of the opinion that this inscription does not relate to the poet: a military career would not fit well with the pronounced anti-militarism of the Satires and, moreover, the Dalmatian legions do not seem to have existed prior to 166 CE. Therefore, it seems likely that this reference is to a Juvenal who was a later relative of the poet, however, as they both came from Aquinum and were associated with the goddess Ceres (the only deity the Satires shows much respect for). If the theory that connects these two Juvenals is correct, then the inscription does show that Juvenal's family was reasonably wealthy, and that, if the poet really was the son of a foreign freedman, then his descendants assimilated into the Roman class structure more quickly than typical. Green thinks it more likely that the tradition of the freedman father is false and, that Juvenal's ancestors had been minor nobility of Roman Italy of relatively ancient descent.

The Satires and their genre 

Juvenal is credited with sixteen known poems divided among five books; all are in the Roman genre of satire, which, at its most basic in the time of the author, comprised a wide-ranging discussion of society and social mores in dactylic hexameter. In Satire I, concerning the scope and content of his work, Juvenal says:

Juvenal claims as his purview, the entire gamut of human experience since the dawn of history. Quintilian—in the context of a discussion of literary genres appropriate for an oratorical education—claimed that, unlike so many literary and artistic forms adopted from Greek models, “satire at least is all ours” (satura quidem tota nostra est). At least in the view of Quintillian, earlier Greek satiric verse (e.g. that of Hipponax) or even Latin satiric prose (e.g. that of Petronius) did not constitute satura, per se. Roman Satura was a formal literary genre rather than being simply clever, humorous critique in no particular format.

Book I:  Satires 1–5
Book II: Satire 6
Book III: Satires 7–9
Book IV: Satires 10–12
Book V: Satires 13–16 (although Satire 16 is incomplete)

The individual Satires (excluding Satire 16) range in length from approximately 130 (Satire 12) to 695 (Satire 6) lines. The poems are not entitled individually, but translators often have added titles for the convenience of readers.

Modern criticism and historical context of the Satires 

While Juvenal's mode of satire has been noted from antiquity for its wrathful scorn toward all representatives of social deviance, some politically progressive scholars such as, W. S. Anderson and later S. M. Braund, have attempted to defend his work as that of a rhetorical persona (mask), taken up by the author to critique the very attitudes he appears to be exhibiting in his works.

In any case it would be an error to read the Satires as a literal account of normal Roman life and thought in the late first and early second centuries CE, just as it would be an error to give credence to every slander recorded in Suetonius against the members of prior imperial dynasties. Themes similar to those of the Satires are present in authors spanning the period of the late Roman Republic and early empire ranging from Cicero and Catullus to Martial and Tacitus; similarly, the stylistics of Juvenal's text fall within the range of post-Augustan literature, as represented by Persius, Statius, and Petronius.

Juvenal's Satires, giving several accounts of Jewish life in first-century Rome, have been regarded by scholars, such as J. Juster and, more recently, Peter Nahon, as a valuable source about early Judaism.

Literary and cultural influence

The Satires have inspired many authors, including Samuel Johnson, who modeled his “London” on Satire III and “The Vanity of Human Wishes” on Satire X. Alexander Theroux, whose novels are rife with vicious satire, identified Juvenal as his most important influence. Juvenal also provided a source for the name for a forensically important beetle, Histeridae. Juvenal is the source of many well-known maxims, including:
that the common people—rather than caring about their freedom—are only interested in “bread and circuses” (panem et circenses 10.81; i.e. food and entertainment),
that—rather than for wealth, power, eloquence, or children—one should pray for a “sound mind in a sound body” (mens sana in corpore sano 10.356),
that a perfect wife is a “rare bird” (rara avis in terris nigroque simillima cycno 6.165; a rare bird in the earth and most similar to a black swan)
that "honesty is praised and left out in the cold"  Probitas laudatur et alget (I, line 74).
and the troubling question of who can be trusted with power—“who will watch the watchers?” or "who will guard the guardians themselves?" (quis custodiet ipsos custodes 6.347–48).

ASICS, the footwear and sports equipment manufacturing company, is named after the acronym of the Latin phrase "anima sana in corpore sano" (a sound mind in a sound body) from Satire X by Juvenal (10.356).

In his autobiography, the German writer Heinrich Böll notes that in the high school he attended when growing up under Nazi rule, an anti-Nazi teacher paid special attention to Juvenal: "Mr. Bauer realized how topical Juvenal was, how he dealt at length with such phenomena as arbitrary government, tyranny, corruption, the degradation of public morals, the decline of the Republican ideal and the terrorizing acts of the Praetorian Guards. (...) In a second-hand bookshop I found an 1838 translation of Juvenal with an extensive commentary, twice the length of the translated text itself, written at the height of the  Romantic period. Though its price was more than I could really afford, I bought it. I read all of it very intensely, as if it was a detective novel. It was one of the few books to which I persistently held on throughout the war (WWII) and beyond, even when most of my other books were lost or sold on the black market".

See also

 Glossarium Eroticum
 Junia (gens)
 Panem et circenses
 Satires (Juvenal)
 Satire VI

Notes

References 

Anderson, William S. (1982) Essays on Roman Satire, Princeton: Princeton University Press.
Braund, Susanna M. (1988) Beyond Anger: A Study of Juvenal’s Third Book of Satires, Cambridge: Press Syndicate of the University of Cambridge.
Braund, Susanna (1996) Juvenal Satires Book I,  Cambridge: Press Syndicate of the University of Cambridge.
Braund, Susanna (1996) The Roman Satirists and their Masks,  London: Bristol Classical Press.
Courtney, E. (1980) A Commentary of the Satires of Juvenal, London: Athlone Press.
Edwards, Catherine (1993) The Politics of Immorality in Ancient Rome, Cambridge: Cambridge University Press.
Gleason, Maud W. (1995) Making Men: Sophists and Self-Presentation in Ancient Rome,  Princeton: Princeton University Press.
Gowers, Emily (1993) The Loaded Table: Representations of Food in Roman Literature,  Oxford: Oxford University Press.
Green, Peter (1989). "Juvenal Revisited". Grand Street, Vol. 9, No. 1 (Autumn, 1989), pp. 175–196.
Green, Peter (trans.) (1998): Juvenal. The Sixteen Satires. London: Penguin Books. (3rd revised edn; first edn published 1967).
Highet, Gilbert (1961) Juvenal the Satirist,  New York: Oxford University Press.
Juvenal (1992) The Satires, Trans. Niall Rudd, Oxford: Oxford University Press.
Juvenal (1992) Persi et Juvenalis Saturae, ed. W. V. Clausen.  London:  Oxford University Press.
 Kelk, Christopher (2010), The Satires of Juvenal: A Verse Translation, Edwin Mellen Press.
Macleane, Arthur J. (1867). Decii Junii Juvenalis et A. Persii Flacci Satirae. With a commentary.
The Oxford Classical Dictionary 3rd ed., 1996, New York: Oxford University Press.
Richlin, Amy (1992) The Garden of Priapus, New York : Oxford University Press.
Rudd, Niall (1982) Themes in Roman Satire, Los Angeles: University of California Press.
Rudd, Niall (tr.) (1991): Juvenal Juvenal: The Satires, with an Introduction and Notes by William Barr. Oxford.
Syme, Ronald (1939) The Roman Revolution, Oxford: Oxford University Press.
Uden, James (2015) The Invisible Satirist: Juvenal and Second-Century Rome. Oxford: Oxford University Press. 
Stramaglia, Antonio; Grazzini, Stefano; Dimatteo, Giuseppe (2015): Giovenale tra storia, poesia e ideologia, Berlin/Boston: De Gruyter.

External links 

 Latin text of The Satires of Juvenal at The Latin Library
 English translations of all 16 satires at the Tertullian Project.  Together with a survey of the manuscript transmission.
 Works by Juvenal at Perseus Digital Library
 English translations of Satires 1, 2, 3, 6, 8 and 9
 Juvenal's first 3 "Satires" in English
 SORGLL:  Juvenal, Satire I.1–30, read by Mark Miner
 Lessons From Juvenal
 
 
 Juvenal and Persius, G. G. Ramsay (ed.), Loeb, London: William Heinemann, New York: G. P. Putnam's sons, 1928.

Juvenalis, Decimus
1st-century births
2nd-century deaths
1st-century Romans
2nd-century Romans
1st-century writers
2nd-century Latin writers
Ancient Romans in Britain
Ancient Roman writers
Ancient Roman satirists
Silver Age Latin writers
People from the Province of Frosinone